Gaylord is a city in Smith County, Kansas, United States.  As of the 2020 census, the population of the city was 87.

History
Gaylord was founded in 1870. It was named for C. E. Gaylord, a native of Marshall County who was one of the town's founders. The Gaylord post office opened in June 1871.

Gaylord was a station on the Missouri Pacific Railroad.

Geography
Gaylord is located at  (39.645229, -98.847008).

Demographics

2010 census
As of the census of 2010, there were 114 people, 59 households, and 32 families living in the city. The racial makeup of the city was 95.6% White, 0.9% African American, 0.9% Native American, and 2.6% from two or more races.

There were 59 households, of which 18.6% had children under the age of 18 living with them, 44.1% were married couples living together, 3.4% had a female householder with no husband present, 6.8% had a male householder with no wife present, and 45.8% were non-families. 42.4% of all households were made up of individuals, and 23.8% had someone living alone who was 65 years of age or older. The average household size was 1.93 and the average family size was 2.59.

The median age in the city was 52.3 years. 19.3% of residents were under the age of 18; 5.3% were between the ages of 18 and 24; 16.6% were from 25 to 44; 29.7% were from 45 to 64; and 28.9% were 65 years of age or older. The gender makeup of the city was 50.0% male and 50.0% female.

2000 census
As of the census of 2000, there were 145 people, 72 households, and 43 families living in the city. The racial makeup of the city was 95.86% White and 4.14% Native American. Hispanic or Latino of any race were 4.14% of the population.

There were 72 households, out of which 23.6% had children under the age of 18 living with them, 55.6% were married couples living together, 4.2% had a female householder with no husband present, and 38.9% were non-families. 38.9% of all households were made up of individuals, and 27.8% had someone living alone who was 65 years of age or older. The average household size was 2.01 and the average family size was 2.64.

In the city, the population was spread out, with 18.6% under the age of 18, 4.8% from 18 to 24, 20.0% from 25 to 44, 24.1% from 45 to 64, and 32.4% who were 65 years of age or older. The median age was 52 years. For every 100 females, there were 79.0 males. For every 100 females age 18 and over, there were 81.5 males.

The median income for a household in the city was $21,250, and the median income for a family was $35,000. Males had a median income of $33,125 versus $15,313 for females. The per capita income for the city was $14,046. There were 8.3% of families and 17.8% of the population living below the poverty line, including 34.8% of under eighteens and 15.2% of those over 64.

Government
The Gaylord government consists of a mayor and five council members.  The council meets the 2nd Wednesday of each month at 7:30PM.
 City Hall, 509 Main Street.

Education
Gaylord  is served by USD 237 Smith Center Schools.

Gaylord schools were closed through school unification. The Gaylord High School mascot was Beavers.

References

Further reading

External links

 City of Gaylord
 Gaylord - Directory of Public Officials
 USD 237, local school district
 Gaylord city map, KDOT

Cities in Kansas
Cities in Smith County, Kansas
1870 establishments in Kansas
Populated places established in 1870